Star Trek: Early Voyages was a comic book series published by Marvel Comics in the United States, running for 17 issues from February 1997 until June 1998. This series was one of the most popular of Marvel's brief stint of Star Trek publishing; however, it was cancelled unceremoniously leaving the cliffhanger unresolved.

Summary
Set ten years before Kirk's five-year mission, this prequel series showcases the adventures of the Enterprise under the command of Captain Christopher Pike.

The series relied heavily on the unaired pilot "The Cage". A mix of all new adventures and battles indicated in the episode eventually led to the incidents of the episode itself, this time featured through the focus of Yeoman Mia Colt. Colt featured in the series such as the time she traveled to the future to meet James T. Kirk. The rest of the series was filled out by all new adventures featuring other members of the crew. Not alone in the limelight, we also see character-centered stories for Nurse Carlotta and Nano, as well as the reasoning for Spock's emotional fit and later adherence to the Vulcan way.

Issues #16 and #17, "Thanatos" and "Nemesis," respectively, are two parts of an unfinished arc, wherein the crew is left in the middle of a conflict with an AI/WMD that is capable of destroying star ships. With the commanding officer incapacitated, the readers are left with a mystery as to how the story is resolved, as it was canceled before the creators could finish the arc.

Main characters
Captain Christopher Pike
Lt. Commander Number One
Lieutenant Spock
Doctor Phillip Boyce
Lieutenant Sita Mohindas
Lieutenant José Tyler
Ensign Nano
Nurse Gabrielle Carlotti
Yeoman Mia Colt
Chief Garrison
Chief Nils Pitcairn

Creative team
Based on Star Trek created by Gene Roddenberry
Primary writers: Dan Abnett and Ian Edginton
Primary pencil artist: Patrick Zircher (followed by Mike Collins, also Javier Pulido)
Primary ink artist: Greg Adams (followed by Steve Moncuse)

Issues

Collected editions
Star Trek: Early Voyages (collects Star Trek: Early Voyages #1–17, 436 pages, IDW Publishing, May 2009)

References

Early Voyages
Comics based on television series
Comics by Dan Abnett
Comics by Ian Edginton
Fiction set in the 23rd century